Bärenfang or Meschkinnes is a German honey-flavoured liqueur based on vodka. It is usually available as Teucke & Koenig Bärenjäger a commercial brand of Bärenfang in English-speaking countries.

 means 'bear trap';  means 'bear hunter'.
Meschkinnes, a term mostly used by people from East Prussia, comes from Lithuanian , meaning 'male bear'.

Bärenfang has an alcohol content of 30%–45% ABV (60–90 proof). In Germany, Bärenfang is often made at home since the basic recipe and many variations of it are readily available. Most homemade Bärenfang is based on vodka, but some recipes with a higher alcohol content are based on neutral spirit.

Bärenfang is always made with honey from nectar because honey from honeydew may have a bitter aftertaste.

History
 
Bärenfang was first developed in East Prussia in the 15th century. It was the first commercial brand of this liqueur that was produced in the capital city of Königsberg; it is now produced by the Teucke & Koenig company in the town of Steinhagen, Germany. A picture of a fur trapper trapping a bear is shown on bottles of Teucke & Koenig's Bärenjäger.

Today, Teucke & Koenig is owned by Schwarze & Schlichte, located in the town of Oelde in North Rhine-Westphalia, Germany. Schwarze & Schlichte also make another brand of Bärenfang that is bottled at 33% ABV (66 proof).

The Bärenfang produced by Teucke & Koenig is widely exported. It is usually sold under the brand name Bärenjäger outside of Germany. There are other producers of Bärenfang in Germany, but their products are less often available in other countries.

Awards
Bärenjäger has been reviewed by the San Francisco World Spirits Competition, which gave it gold and silver medals in 2011 and 2012 respectively. Wine Enthusiast rated Bärenjäger in its "85–89" category.

Proof66's averaging of these scores produced an overall score that classified it as a "Tier 1" spirit.

See also 
Schnapps

References

External links
 Schwarze & Schlichte website (German)
 U.S. website (English, requires Flash)

German liqueurs
Honey liqueurs and spirits
German distilled drinks
German brands
East Prussia